The Philippines competed at the 2016 Summer Paralympics in Rio de Janeiro, Brazil, from 7 to 18 September 2016.

Background
The Philippine Paralympic delegation was represented by 5 sportspeople in four sports. Table tennis player Josephine Medina was the delegation's flag bearer in the opening ceremony, for the second straight time.

The delegation included coaches, Ramond Debuque (powelifting), Joel Deriada (athletics), Louise Mark Eballa (table tennis), and Antonio Ong (swimming), with Dennis Esta as the Chef d' Mision  and as well as the team doctor Raul Michael Cembrano. Philippine Sports Association of the Differently Abled President Michael Barredo and Secretary General Ral Rosario was also part of the Paralympic delegation.

Athletics 

The Philippines qualified 1 athlete for athletics. Long jumper Andy Avellana, was also among the athletes reportedly to have qualified but was not part of the Philippine delegation in later reports because he was not able to get a wildcard slot.

Track

Swimming 

The Philippines has qualified 1 athlete for Swimming.

Table tennis 

The Philippines qualified 1 athlete for table tennis.

Women

Powerlifting 

The Philippines qualified 2 athletes ( and ) for Powerlifting.

See also
Philippines at the 2016 Summer Olympics

References

Nations at the 2016 Summer Paralympics
2016
2016 in Philippine sport